Rory James O'Malley (born December 23, 1980) is an American actor, best known for his Tony Award-nominated performance as Elder McKinley in The Book of Mormon. He is a co-founder of the gay rights activist group Broadway Impact.

Early life
O'Malley was born in Cleveland, Ohio, and was brought up by his single mother, who is of Irish ancestry. He grew up Catholic. He graduated from Saint Ignatius High School in Cleveland, Ohio and Carnegie Mellon University. O'Malley became friends with actors Josh Gad and Leslie Odom Jr. at Carnegie Mellon University and remains good friends with them.

Career

Film and television
O'Malley made a small cameo appearance in On the Run in 2004. His best-known screen appearance was in the 2007 film adaptation of Dreamgirls. O'Malley also performed the song "Cadillac Car" on the soundtrack, Dreamgirls: Music from the Motion Picture.

In 2018, he became a series regular on Lifetime's American Princess.

Theatre
O'Malley starred as Charlie Brown in the 2004 Falcon Theatre production of Snoopy! The Musical, which ran from June 24 to July 18, 2004, in Los Angeles. He also starred as Richie Cunningham in the 2006 Los Angeles premiere of Happy Days, as well as the 2007 Goodspeed Opera House production.

In October 2008, he appeared alongside Colin Donnell and Laura Osnes in the then Broadway-bound musical Pride and Prejudice as Charles Bingley, at the Eastman Theatre in Rochester, New York.

O'Malley's first appearance on Broadway was in the musical The 25th Annual Putnam County Spelling Bee, replacing actors in the roles of Leaf Coneybear, William Barfee, and Douglas Panch. Regionally, he has appeared in Kiss of the Spider Woman as Valentin, a Marxist revolutionary. Other work includes Charley's Aunt as Charley and Santa Claus Is Coming to Motown as Kris Kringle. O'Malley's first appearance Off-Broadway was the 2009 revival of Newsical, directed by Mark Waldrop.

He originated the role of Elder McKinley in the musical The Book of Mormon, which opened on Broadway on March 24, 2011. The New York Times  reviewer wrote, "But allow me to single out my personal favorites. 'Turn It Off' is a hilarious chorus-line piece about repression, performed by the (all-male Mormon) missionaries and destined to make a star of its lead singer and dancer, Rory O'Malley (whose character is repressed in his own special way)." For this role, O'Malley was nominated for the 2011 Drama Desk Award for Outstanding Featured Actor in a Musical, and was also nominated for a Tony Award.

On July 18, 2011, O'Malley participated in a reading of George Bernard Shaw's play, Fanny's First Play, a satire of theater critics, at the Players Club in Manhattan, New York City.

He appeared as Frank Hoover in Little Miss Sunshine at the Off-Broadway Second Stage Theatre from October 2013 to December 2013.

O'Malley also participated in the Dustin Lance Black play 8, a chronicle reenactment of the federal case that overturned California's Proposition 8.

He assumed the role of King George III from Jonathan Groff in the original Broadway production of Hamilton on April 11, 2016. O'Malley ended his run on January 16, 2017, performing the role on the national tour, following his nine-month tenure on Broadway.

Podcasts
O’Malley is the creator and host of the podcast Living the Dream with Rory O’Malley, where he talks to fellow industry people about the reality of being an actor. He created it after joining the cast of Hamilton and realizing that young fans of the show were seeing an unrealistic and cultivated depiction of the life of a Broadway actor. The podcast is currently on an indefinite hold, but O’Malley has expressed plans to resume making it.

O’Malley is also the host of The Geffen Playhouse's Unscripted.

Charity work
O'Malley is an active supporter of gay rights, establishing the activism group Broadway Impact in 2009 with Gavin Creel and Jenny Kanelos. O'Malley said of the group in late 2010:

"Since its first year, Broadway Impact has held massive rallies for equality in New York City, made thousands of calls through phone banks and even organized 25 buses to Washington, D.C. so that 1,400 people could attend the National Equality March for free. This year we were honored to receive the 2010 Human Rights Campaign Community Award and even participated in the ING New York City Marathon as a charity team. Our team of 12 runners, including myself, raised $38,440 for Broadway Impact!"

On August 15, 2010, O'Malley performed in the benefit concert Sing for the Cure, at Don't Tell Mama in New York City. He was also featured in a Broadway Impact fundraiser on November 2, 2010, hosted by Gavin Creel. Another concert, also benefiting Broadway Impact, had been held prior to that, taking place on July 25, 2010. He also participated in the Broadway Sings for Pride concert in June 2011. On July 9, 2011, O'Malley joined Mary Tyler Moore, Bernadette Peters and others in the 2011 Broadway Barks adopt-a-thon. That same year, O'Malley was named a Givenik Ambassador.

In 2012, O'Malley and his spouse Gerold Schroeder were featured in a GAP ad, cheek to cheek, with the caption "BE ONE."

In October 2020, O'Malley joined many other Broadway stars in a virtual voter education and letter-writing party sponsored by VoteRiders to raise awareness about voter ID requirements.

Personal life
A gay man, O'Malley came out at the age of 19.
On July 21, 2013, O'Malley announced his engagement to boyfriend Gerold Schroeder via Facebook, and they married on September 28, 2014. Gerold Schroeder is one of three sons of Peter Schroeder, a partner in the law firm Norris Choplin Schroeder in Indianapolis, Indiana.

Via posts on Instagram, Facebook, and Twitter, O'Malley announced on November 22, 2018, that "after more than two years of paperwork, home studies, joy, heartache, and grace" he and husband Gerold Schroeder had adopted a newborn baby boy. Jimmy's adoption was finalized on September 7, 2019.

Filmography

Theatre credits

Television

Awards and nominations

See also
 LGBT culture in New York City
 List of LGBT people from New York City

References

External links
Official website

1980 births
Living people
Male actors from Cleveland
American male musical theatre actors
Carnegie Mellon University College of Fine Arts alumni
American gay actors
American LGBT rights activists
LGBT people from Ohio
American people of Irish descent